Mary Eaton (1901–1948) was an American actor.

Mary Eaton may also refer to:

 Mary E. Eaton (1844–1915), African American suffragist
 Mary Emily Eaton (1873–1961), English botanical artist

See also
 Mary Heaton (disambiguation)